Villo! (a portmanteau of the French words "Ville" (City) and "Vélo" (Bicycle)) is a public bicycle rental programme in Brussels-Capital Region, Belgium.

It was launched on 19 May 2009 in cooperation between the Brussels-Capital region and the company JCDecaux as a replacement of the former scheme Cyclocity, launched in 2006.

The scheme is currently in its second phase of expansion which will see a system of 5,000 bikes in all of the municipalities of the Brussels region by 2013, making it one of the biggest in the world.

Overview

The bicycles are equipped with adjustable-height saddle, 7-speed gear, front basket, covered chain drive, always-on front and rear lights, front and rear disc brakes, puncture-resistant Schwalbe Marathon tires and integrated bicycle lock; this all adds up to a weight of 22 kg.

Since May 2011, holders of a MoBIB card for STIB, the Brussels mass transit authority, have been able to use their card to access the Villo! network. Use of Villo increases on days of public transit strikes, for example doubling on the day of the general strike, 30 January 2012.

As of December 2011 the system had 27,000 regular subscribers. On average 25,000 bikes were used per week. Plans are under way for an expansion of the network in a second phase which will expand to all of the communities in the Brussels area by 2013. By the end of this phase there should be 360 sites and 5000 bikes available. Some popular stations will also be expanded to deal with demand.

According to the Region of Brussels, 400 car parking places have been removed to make way for villo stations during the first phase of the project. Some residents have complained about the loss of permanent parking spots, but proponents of the programme argue that overall the programme should increase the amount of parking available due to a long-term reduction in motorised traffic.

Cyclocity

The original cyclocity programme, also run by JCDecaux was launched on 17 September 2006 to coincide with Car Free Day that year.  Originally there were 250 bikes available at 23 stations, exclusively in the city of Brussels proper, that is to say the old city. The programme was not a success, with most of the blame going to the limited scope of the network. It was relaunched under the Villo! brand in 2009 with an expanded network.

Issues

Bicycle Distribution 
Stations especially those at greater elevations are regularly empty. Other stations are regularly full. JCDecaux tries to fix this problem by transporting bicycles between stations with special vans but the service is insufficient. The company has said it will expand some stations to address the problem in September 2010. The independent website "Where's My Villo?" uses real-time data to track the performance of Brussels' bike-sharing scheme, Villo!, and aims to get JCDecaux to improve bike availability. Phase 2, to be implemented in 2012 will also see the expansion of some of the most popular stations.

Stations 
There are 346 (April 2015) stations in all municipalities of the Brussels-Capital Region.

The density of stations in each municipality varies from 0.3 to 4.5 stations/km2.The five most used stations are (in 2011): 
 Brussels-Luxembourg railway station (5845 uses/month)
 Flagey (4598/month)
 Celtes (3060/month)
 Bourse (3037/month)
 Lesbroussart (2624/month)

The five least used stations are (in 2011):
 Van Lint (125 uses/month)
 Heliotropes (164 uses/month)
 Sainte-Anne (188 uses/month)
 Hopital francais (222 uses/month)
 Tref centrum (236 uses/month)

Average monthly usage per station was 1251.

Details of the stations:

References

External links 

 
 Where's My Villo? 
 Real Time Network Status

2009 establishments in Belgium
Public transport in Brussels
Bicycle sharing in Belgium